Anglo-Chinese School (ACS) is a family of Methodist schools in Singapore and Indonesia. It was founded in 1886 by Bishop William Fitzjames Oldham as an extension of the Methodist Church. Anglo-Chinese School is usually abbreviated as "ACS", with Anglo-Chinese Junior College abbreviated as "ACJC". Its students and alumni are referred to as "ACSians". ACS was the first school in Singapore to have a flower named after it, the "Ascocenda Anglo-Chinese School orchid", a hybrid created by the school to mark its 116th Founder's Day on 1 March 2002.

History

Founded on 1 March 1886 by Bishop William Fitzjames Oldham as an extension of the Methodist Church, the school was a shophouse at 70 Amoy Street, Singapore with 13 pupils. The name of the school came from its conducting lessons in Chinese in the morning and English in the afternoon. By the following year, enrollment had increased to 104 and the school moved to Coleman Street.

Between 1914 and 1920, under the leadership of the Reverend J. S. Nagle, the school introduced regular religious (or "chapel") services and physical education classes. Afternoon classes were started for academically weak pupils. In a bid to ensure continuity in school life and keep the school adequately staffed, Nagle encouraged ex-students, known as "old boys", to join the school as teachers. The Anglo-Chinese School Old Boys' Association is a link through which many "old boys" continue to maintain close ties with the school.

The Anglo-Chinese Continuation School started in 1925 under a new principal, the Reverend P.L. Peach, who had to leave the school due to the newly imposed government age limits on school attendance by boys. ACS became the Oldham Methodist School while a secondary school opened in Cairnhill Road.

During the World War II Japanese occupation of Singapore between 1942 and 1945, lessons were suspended. The school opened again in 1946, a year after the Japanese surrender, once the buildings at Cairnhill and Coleman Street had been made safe following damage sustained during the war. The pre-war principal, T. W. Hinch, who had been interned by the Japanese during the occupation and had been sent back to England to recover, returned to the school in June 1946. He set up "X" and "Y" classes, each with different levels of difficulty, for students who had missed years of their education due to the occupation. In September 1950, the secondary school relocated from Cairnhill Street to Barker Road.

In the same year, the school set up "post school certificate classes", later known as "pre-university classes", to prepare students for tertiary education; the first batch of girl students were enrolled in ACS. Students in the lower grades continued to be all male, a practice which persists to this day. Dr Thio Chan Bee, the first Asian principal of ACS, took over in 1952. During his tenure, both the Cairnhill and Barker Road premises expanded, in the latter's case through the building of Lee Hall, a three-storey building housing twelve classrooms and four laboratories.

The Oldham Methodist Secondary School merged with the Secondary School at Barker Road in January 1961. The school completed the construction of the sports complex at Barker Road in 1970, with an Olympic-sized swimming pool (the first in all the schools in Singapore) and a sports hall. In 1977, pre-university classes shifted to the newly constructed Anglo-Chinese Junior College at 25 Dover Close East, off North Buona Vista Road, leaving the Barker Road site for the secondary and junior schools. The junior school relocated to new premises in its old neighborhood at Cairnhill in 1985.

ACS celebrated its centenary in 1986 with the publication of a hardback history of the school, titled Hearts, Hopes and Aims, that detailed the rich student and teacher life over the years.

In 1988, when the Ministry of Education started its independent school program, the school reorganized. New regulations allowed schools access to private funding and subjected them to less government regulation in the content of their curricula. Renamed ACS (Independent), in 1993 the school vacated the Barker Road campus and moved to Dover Road. After strong lobbying by alumni, the Barker Road site became the site of a second secondary school. At the same time, the Anglo-Chinese Primary School abandoned its Coleman Street premises (the old building now housing the National Archives of Singapore) to share premises with the new secondary school at Barker Road, now named ACS (Barker Road).

Complete rebuilding of the Barker Road campus took place in the late 1990s, with ACS (Barker Road) temporarily relocating during the project. The school ultimately split into primary and secondary school sections, the latter retaining the Barker Road suffix and the former becoming ACS (Primary). On 4December 2002, the two schools, ACS Oldham Hall, the Methodist Church in Singapore and the Barker Road Methodist Church moved back to the newly built campus at Barker Road. The Deputy Prime Minister of Singapore, Dr. Tony Tan, opened the new school on July 15, 2003.

In January 2005, ACS (International) officially opened to the public. A completely private school, it took students from both Singapore and other countries. Its students take the International General Certificate of Secondary Education in their fourth year, then go on to take a two-year International Baccalaureate diploma from 2007 onwards. Before that, they take the International A-Levels. ACS(I) was officially authorised by the International Baccalaureate Organisation to offer the IB Diploma Programme in January 2006. and is recognised as an IB World School.

ACS Jakarta formally joined the ACS family in July 2006 as Sekolah Tiara Bangsa - ACS (International) Jakarta until an official name change in 2015. It is a co-ed school for students from Kindergarten to Grade 12 offering the Cambridge Primary Checkpoint at Grade 6, the Cambridge International General Certificate of Secondary Education (IGCSE) at Grade 10 and either Cambridge International A Levels or the International Baccauaureate Diploma Programme (IBDP) at Grade 12.

There are seven schools under the Anglo-Chinese School umbrella. ACS (Junior) and ACS (Primary) are the primary schools while ACS (Barker Road), ACS (Independent), ACS (International) and ACJC provide secondary and post-secondary education. ACS Jakarta is the only ACS school outside of Singapore and offers classes to boys and girls from Grades 1 to 12.

When Bishop Oldham started the school in 1886, he took in some students as boarders. The boarding facility soon expanded and moved into larger and larger houses, first into Bellevue's Oldham Lane, then to Dunearn House at Barker Road. In 1986, when ACS celebrated its centennial year, the boarding school known as Oldham Hall moved into new premises within the ACS Barker Road campus. It moved back to the rebuilt premises in December 2002 and became ACS Oldham Hall.

Aims

Anglo-Chinese Schools' shared philosophy is "To create conditions for students to embody excellence, to establish an environment for spiritual, intellectual and physical growth, to prepare pupils to meet the challenge of rapid change in society". Its school motto is "The Best Is Yet To Be." The phrase is taken from the first line of the Robert Browning poem, Rabbi ben Ezra (1864), "Grow old along with me! / The best is yet to be..."

School anthem and crest
Adapted by teacher Henry Martyn Hoisington in 1926, the shared anthem of Anglo-Chinese Schools is adapted from the unofficial Canadian national anthem, "The Maple Leaf Forever". Drawing inspiration from the anthem, Yap Pheng Geck designed the school arms in 1930.

Placed in chief azure above the three letters of the school name is a golden creature with a lion's head, eagle's wings and a dragon's body with claws, representing the school's founding at a time when Singapore was still a British colony, by an American Methodist mission during the Qing dynasty in China. This creature is an heraldic wyvern.

The lower part of the field consists of two panels, blue and gold, which represent heaven and earth. The colours also symbolize both spiritual and material accomplishment. The letters "ACS" in red symbolize life forming a bridge between both; they also symbolize the blood of Christ uniting heaven and earth. In addition to the school name, the letters ACS are also variously said to spell out academic achievements, Christian character, and sportsmanship or service beyond self. The overall shape of the shield represents the knightly virtues of chivalry, honour, loyalty, valour, and manliness.

Achievements
Anglo-Chinese family of schools have received annual school awards given out by the Ministry of Education of Singapore. ACS (Independent) has achieved the Singapore Quality Award, all four Best Practice Awards, School Distinction and School Excellence Awards. ACS (Barker Road) and ACS (Independent) have also obtained Sustained Achievement Awards in sports, uniformed groups and the aesthetics. ACJC has obtained the Sustained Achievement Awards for sports, physical fitness and aesthetics.

Odyssey of the Mind
ACS (Junior), ACS (Independent), ACJC, ACS (Primary), and ACS (Barker) have all won multiple national championships in the international Odyssey of the Mind (OM) Competition, and have represented Singapore at the World Finals since 1998. The ACS schools have a combined tally of more than 40 titles at the National Finals, and 13 trophies and four honourable mentions from the World Finals.

Sports

Swimming is a traditional pillar of ACS. The various ACS schools have also won the "B" Division (Under-17) Schools' Swimming Championships for 43 consecutive years since the start of the competition in 1960. In 2003 they were beaten by Raffles Institution, an academic and sports rival, but the school won back the title in 2004. ACS has also produced national-level competition swimmers including Ang Peng Siong and more recently, Mark Chay. They have also produced Singapore's first Olympic Champion, Joseph Issac Schooling.

In rugby, ACS has been represented by ACS (Independent) and ACS (Barker Road). These two schools have reached the top four placings in both the "B" and "C" Divisions of the National School Championships. with ACS (Independent) first placed every year. The "B" Division team lost to sporting rivals St Andrew's Secondary School between 2004 and 2007 but have since regained the "B" Division title, after beating St Andrew's 15-3 in 2007. ACS (Independent) also won the International Festival of Youth Rugby 2000 in Wales and the World Minis Under-13 and Under-14 Championships 2001 in South Africa.

ACJC held the "A" Division (Under-19) championship from 2000 until they lost to Raffles Junior College in 2004 by a narrow margin. In addition to the victories by ACS (Barker Road), ACS (Independent) and ACJC, the ACS Family completed the Rugby Grand Slams in 1997, 1999, 2001, 2002 and 2003.

Although Anglo Chinese Junior College's (ACJC) sailing programme has been discontinued, ACS (Barker Road), ACS (Junior) and ACS (Primary) have always been one of the top few secondary or primary schools in the field.

Performing arts

Choir
Since its inception into the Ministry of Education Choral Excellence Programme, the ACJC Choir has received both international and local accolades. Since 1989, it has toured Japan, South Korea, the United States, the United Kingdom, Australia and countries within Europe. The choir has also participated in choral competitions in the United Kingdom, Finland, Sweden, the Netherlands, Slovakia, and the Czech Republic. emerging with honours in these festivals. The choir remains the only Singaporean choir invited by the International Federation of Choral Music to represent the country at the 4th World Symposium on Choral Music.

At home, the ACJC Choir is the five-time winner of the Singapore Youth Festival "Choir of the Year" competition (2001, 1997, 1995, 1993, 1989) and holder of the "Best Junior College Choir title (2003, 2001, 1997). Most recently in 2011, the choir received the "Gold with Honours" award at the SYF Choral Competition. The choir is conducted by Valarie Wilson.

In June 2008, the Anglo-Chinese Junior College Choir emerged as the only choir with three Gold medals at the 3rd Festa Choralis International Choir Competition in Bratislava, Slovakia. As the only Asian choir at the competition, the ACJC Choir competed in the Mixed Choir (Adult), Youth Choir (up to 19 years old) and Folk Song Categories. In all three categories, the ACJC Choir won gold medals with top marks and was the only choir in the competition whom the adjudicators accorded a perfect score of 100 points.

The ACS (Independent) Choir is part of the Singapore Choral Excellence Scheme, and toured Perth in 2004. Under the leadership of its earlier conductor, Ms Grace Lo, the choir recorded a series of achievements in the 1980s and 1990s. Since then, the choir has won a Gold Award at the Singapore Youth Festival in 2005 under its conductor Elaine Wan Chan, who also composed the NDP 2005 Theme Song.

ACS Military Band
The band started around 1966 as a brass band of 27 members and in time evolved into a full symphonic band with a membership of around 100, adding a pipe section in 1974. In the Annual Band Competition, the band won the top award for concert performance for three successive years, 1974, 1975 and 1976 and also took out the top award for pattern display in 1974 and 1975. The band has recorded several times for Radio and Television Singapore and had been a guest performer for Hong Kong TVB's "Enjoy Yourself Tonight" live-colour telecast.

Band
The Anglo Chinese School (Junior) Concert Band began in 2002 with a membership of around 15 that has since grown to about 50. The Band made its debut in the Central Judging of Concert Bands (also known as the Singapore Youth Festival) in 2006 where, under conductor Mr Wong Yew Hon, they were awarded a silver medal. In 2007, the Band participated in the 18th Australian International Music Festival in Sydney and performed at the Sydney Opera House. In 2008, the Concert Band participated in the Beijing International Music Festival where they were accorded the highest marks for their performance. In 2009, the band won gold at the Hong Kong Winter Band Festival. In March 2011, the Band's home-grown "Thrashers" performed at the Combined One ACS Founder's Day Service at the Kallang Indoor Stadium. During March of the same year the band won top prizes at the School's Junior Superstars. In 2012, the band won a Gold Award at the Singapore Youth Festival (SYF) Central Judging for the first time. They are conducted by Mr Ong Beng Choon and the band has won gold awards and been judged the top band for several Singapore Youth Festival Competitions. These include the SYF Central judging in 2007 for concert bands whereby the band was one of the only three bands to be awarded a gold with honours. The Anglo-Chinese Junior College Concert Band also participated in the 17th Australian International Music Festival where they received a gold as well as being selected as the adjudicator's choice for the command band of the festival. Under the baton of music director Mr Francis Tan, the ACS (Independent) Symphonic Band finished in the top three at the 2005, 2007 and 2009 Singapore Youth Festivals, obtaining gold with honours, and the Gold Award at the Singapore International Band Festival in 2012,2014 and 2016, claiming the Champion Band award in 2016. The ACS (Independent) Symphonic Band has also attained various awards in the Australian International Music Festival, Singapore International Band Festival, Hong Kong Winter Band Festival and National Band Competition.

Orchestra
The ACJC String Ensemble won a gold award at the 2003, 2005 and 2007 Singapore Youth Festival Central Judging. It is conducted by Singapore Symphony Orchestra associate principal bassist, Yang Zheng Yi.

The ACS (Independent) Philharmonic Orchestra also achieved gold in the SYF central judging for 1999, 2001, 2003, 2005, 2009, 2011; two Gold with Honours awards in 2007, and a distinction under the new SYF Arts Presentation in 2013. The Philharmonic Orchestra is currently conducted by the associate principal bassist of the Singapore Symphony Orchestra, Yang Zheng Yi.

Since its inception in 2007, the ACJC Guitar Ensemble (ACGE) has obtained one gold with honours in 2007, one gold award in 2009 at the Singapore Youth Festival Central Judging for Instrument Ensembles and a Certificate of Distinction in 2013, under the revised awards scheme for the Singapore Youth Festival Art Presentations. They organise two annual concerts - Glissando in May and A Christmas Story in December, to raise funds for their adopted charity, Club Rainbow. The ensemble is conducted by Mr. Terence Choo.

The school's guitar orchestra achieved three gold awards in the SYF Central Judging competition for 2003, 2005, 2007 and one gold with honours in 2009. The guitar orchestra is conducted by Mr Michael Gaspar, who is also a conductor for Junior Colleges such as Victoria Junior College.

The ACS (Barker Road) Chinese orchestra of achieved the Gold award in the SYF Central Judging Competition for 2005, 2007 and 2009. The Chinese Orchestra is conducted by Benedict Tan, an alumnus of ACS (Barker Road).

Dance
ACS (Independent)'s Dance Venia, won the gold with honours award at the Singapore Youth Festival 2009 their first time participating in the event. Under main choreographer Jennifer Pau and other guest choreographers, the club has put on performances at events including Festival of Arts 2008, 2009 and 2010, as well as competed in various competitions including DanceWorks 2010.
ACS (Barker Road)'s dance group won the Gold and at the Singapore Youth Festival 2011 and achieved a distinction in 2013. The group participated in DanceWorks 2010, 2011,2012 and 2013, achieving the second position in 2011, the third position in 2010 and 2012 and champions in 2013.
Anglo-Chinese School (Barker Road) first formed their dance team in 2003 and subsequently won gold in the Singapore Youth Festival for that year.

Drama
The school's Junior College section, known as the Anglo-Chinese School Independent Stage (ACSIS), won gold in the Singapore Youth Festival 2012, for the play "Rabbit". This was ACSIS' most recent participation in this competition.

The school's Secondary section, the Anglo-Chinese School Drama Club (ACSDC) won silver in the Singapore Youth Festival 2011. In April 2012, they performed a spoof of CSI: Crime Scene Investigation, called A:CSI. Later that year, they performed in a sequel called A:CSI (II).

In 2013, ACSDC participated in the 2013 SYF with a play entitled "The Day I Met The Prince", a take on Kuo Pao Kun's piece. They won a distinction, the equivalent of a gold in the new SYF grading system.

The members of both clubs are drawn from the Anglo-Chinese School (Independent).

Debating
ACJC has won the national debating championship for pre-university institutions on a number of occasions, most recently in 2013 and 2014. ACS (Independent) also won the competition in 2010 and 2018. ACS (Independent) won the Singapore Secondary Schools Debating Championships (SSSDC) Division I title in 2005 and 2013, and was also crowned National Secondary School Debating Champions in 1998 in the pre-SSSDC era. ACS (Barker Road) won the SSSDC Division II title in 2010 and 2014 and Division III title in 2004. Many debaters from the schools have gone on to represent Singapore in the World Schools Debating Championships.

Schools

Anglo-Chinese School (Primary)
Anglo-Chinese School (Primary) was separated from the secondary classes in 1928 and was located at Coleman Street while the secondary classes moved to the new building at Cairnhill. In 1951, a branch school was established at Barker Road. In 1957, ACPS in Coleman Street catered to pupils from Primary 1 to 3 while Primary 4 to 6 classes remained known as ACJS. In 1961, leaving the Barker Road campus to be used for secondary and pre-university classes, Mr Lau Hee Boon became the first autonomous principal of ACPS with pupils from Primary 1 to 6, incorporating the Oldham Methodist Primary School with classes from Primary 1 to 6 in the afternoon. At the end of 1984, the junior school moved to 25 Peck Hay Road, while the primary school continued lessons at Canning Rise until 1994. It merged with the Barker Road school in that year, but in December 1998 relocated temporarily to 9 Ah Hood Road while waiting for the completion of the Barker Road campus rebuilding project. The school moved back to Barker Road on 4 December 2002.

The school's students sit for the local PSLE in primary class six and have the option to move on to the ACS Secondary Schools with affiliation favours.

The principal is Leong-Ho Hil May.

Anglo-Chinese School (Junior)

Anglo-Chinese School (Junior), formerly named Anglo-Chinese Junior School, is one of the two ACS primary schools in Singapore. Established in 1951 at the old Coleman Street campus, it moved to its former premises at 25 Peck Hay Road at the end of 1984. In December 2008, it relocated to a new building at 16 Winstedt Road.

Its students sit for the local PSLE in primary class six and have the option to move on to the ACS Secondary Schools with affiliation favours.

Anglo-Chinese School (Independent)

Anglo-Chinese School which was founded in 1886, obtained its independence status from MOE in 1988. In 1988, Anglo-Chinese Secondary School was renamed Anglo-Chinese School (Independent). 
After receiving its independent status, the school had outgrown the Barker Road campus and plans were made to construct a new building. It relocated to 121 Dover Road in 1992. The campus houses a sports complex and a boarding school. The campus has also been expanded with a new teaching block to accommodate the influx of International Baccalaureate (IB) students.

ACS (Independent) offers an integrated programme of GCE 'O' Levels and the International Baccalaureate, after its appointment as an IB World School in 2005.

The current principal is Arene Koh.

Anglo-Chinese School (Barker Road)

Anglo-Chinese School (Barker Road) opened in 1994 and is located at the Barker Road campus. It moved to the former Swiss Cottage Primary School while awaiting completion of the Barker Road rebuilding project. The school is divided into primary and secondary sections, the latter retaining the Barker Road suffix and the former becoming ACS (Primary).

ACS (Barker Road) offers the 4 and 5-year GCE 'O' Levels programme for its students. Some students then move on to Anglo-Chinese Junior College to continue their ACS education.

The current principal is Loo Ming Yaw.

Anglo-Chinese School (International) Singapore

Anglo-Chinese School (International) is a private school where students take a six-year course, with the International General Certificate of Secondary Education (IGCSE) in the fourth year and the International Baccalaureate in the sixth year from 2007 onwards. Before that date students took International A-Levels. The school opened in January 2005 with 150 students and is located in Holland Village on the former premises of the now defunct Buona Vista Secondary School at 61 Jalan Hitam Manis. The school's previous principals include the Rev John Barrett, (former principal of The Leys School, Cambridge, UK, and chair of the World Methodist Council), and P. Kerr Fulton-Peebles.

The current principal is Gavin Kinch.

Anglo-Chinese Secondary School
Anglo-Chinese Secondary School was before Anglo-Chinese (Barker Road) and Anglo-Chinese (Independent).

Anglo-Chinese Junior College

Anglo-Chinese Junior College opened in 1977 and offers a standard two-year pre-university program similar to other junior colleges, with students taking GCE A-Levels in their second year. The school is located at 25 Dover Close East. In the late 1990s, the campus received an upgrade as well as having a sports complex added.

The current principal is Shirleen Chee.

ACS Jakarta

ACS Jakarta began in July 1996 as Sekolah Tiara Bangsa (STB) before formally joining the ACS Family as STB-ACS (International) Jakarta in July 2006 following a number of years of collaboration. The name was officially changed to ACS Jakarta in 2015. It caters to students from Nursery to Grade 12. Students in Grades 16 follow the syllabus prescribed by the Cambridge Primary Checkpoint Programme, while Grade 10 students sit for the IGCSE after beginning their preparation in Grade 9. Students in Grades 11 and 12 are placed on the IB Diploma Programme.

The executive principal is Lee Khen Seng.

Notable alumni
The Anglo-Chinese School has produced notable alumni.

 Dr Tay Eng Soon, deceased junior Education Minister, Singapore
 Joseph Schooling, national swimmer, Olympics Gold Medallist
 Lim Nee Soon, Business and community leader

In popular culture
 ACS is mentioned repeatedly as the alma mater of numerous Singapore-based characters in the Crazy Rich Asians trilogy.

See also
List of the oldest schools in the world
Anglo-Chinese School (Primary)
Anglo-Chinese School (Junior)
Anglo-Chinese School (Independent)
Anglo-Chinese School (Barker Road)
Anglo-Chinese School (International) Singapore
Anglo-Chinese Junior College
ACS Jakarta

External links

Anglo-Chinese School website
Anglo-Chinese School anthem - full lyrics, with MIDI
ACS (Independent) website
Anglo-Chinese Junior College website
ACS (Barker Road) website
ACS (International) website
ACS (Primary) website
ACS (Junior) website
ACS Jakarta website
ACS Oldham Hall website
The Methodist Church in Singapore website

References

 
 
Educational institutions established in 1886
Methodist schools
Boys' schools in Singapore
1886 establishments in British Malaya